The 2017 SWAC women's soccer tournament was the postseason women's soccer tournament for the Southwestern Athletic Conference held November 2–5, 2017. The seven-match tournament took place at the Prairie View A&M Soccer Stadium in Prairie View, Texas. The eight-team single-elimination tournament consisted of three rounds based on seeding from regular season conference play. The defending champions were the Alabama State Hornets and they successfully defended their title by virtue of winning the penalty shoot-out tiebreaking procedure following a tie with the Grambling State Tigers in the tournament final. The conference tournament title was the second in the history of the Alabama State women's soccer program, both of which have come under the direction of head coach Jodie Smith.

Bracket

Schedule

Quarterfinals

Semifinals

Final

Statistics

Goalscorers 

3 Goals
 Kela Gray - Howard

1 Goal
 Sheyenne Bonnick - Mississippi Valley
 Hollie Cartwright - Howard
 Shyann Cordova - Alabama State
 Florence David - Grambling State
 Yaira Guardado - Alcorn State
 Paige Hayward - Texas Southern
 Kaylee Holt - Grambling State
 Teaggan Ilela - Alabama State
 Inma Martinez - Alabama State
 Kelly Sanders - Texas Southern
 Aleeya Sawyer - Howard
 Jasmine Smith - Grambling State
 Brittany Terry - Grambling State

References

External links 
2017 SWAC Women's Soccer Championship

Southwestern Athletic Conference Women's Soccer Tournament
2017 Southwestern Athletic Conference women's soccer season